Ryszard Fabiszewski (born 15 May 1952) is a former international speedway rider from Poland.

Speedway career 
Fabiszewski won a silver medal at the Speedway World Team Cup in the 1977 Speedway World Team Cup.

World final appearances

World Team Cup
 1977 -  Wrocław, Olympic Stadium (with Edward Jancarz / Marek Cieślak / Jerzy Rembas / Bogusław Nowak) - 2nd - 25pts

References 

1952 births
Polish speedway riders
Living people
Sportspeople from Gorzów Wielkopolski